David Haggerty might refer to:

David Haggerty (footballer) (born 1991), English footballer
David Haggerty (tennis) (born 1950s), American tennis administrator